The 2011 Ju-Jitsu World Championship were the 10th edition of the Ju-Jitsu World Championships, and were held in Cali, Colombia from October 15 to October 16, 2011.

Schedule 
15.10.2011 – Men's and Women's Fighting System, Men's and Women's Jiu-Jitsu (ne-waza), Men's and Women's Duo System – Classic
16.10.2011 – Men's and Women's Fighting System, Men's and Women's Jiu-Jitsu (ne-waza), Mixed Duo System – Classic

European Ju-Jitsu

Fighting System

Men's events

Women's events

Duo System

Duo Classic events

Brazilian Jiu-Jitsu

Men's events

Women's events

Links

References

External links
Official results (PDF)